Alsancak Gar is a light-rail station on the Konak Tram of the Tram İzmir system in İzmir, Turkey. It is located along Liman Avenue, next to Alsancak station. Transfer to İZBAN commuter rail service is available at Alsancak station. 

Alsancak Gar station opened on 24 March 2018.

Connections
ESHOT operates city bus service on Liman Avenue.

Nearby places of interest
Alsancak railway station
Yzb. Şerafettin Bey Street - Plenty of Greek houses from the Ottoman Empire.
İzmir Towngas Factory - A former towngas plant, turned into a museum and open air theater.

Pictures

References

Railway stations opened in 2018
2018 establishments in Turkey
Konak District
Tram transport in İzmir